Arud may refer to:

 Arabic prosody
 Arud, Iran, in Mazandaran Province, Iran
 Arud, Tehran, Iran